James Albert Bowen (born November 30, 1937) is an American record producer and former rockabilly sincere. Bowen brought Nancy Sinatra and Lee Hazlewood together, and introduced Sinatra to Mel Tillis for their album, Mel & Nancy.

Early life
Bowen was born in Santa Rita, New Mexico, United States. His family moved to Dumas, Texas, when he was eight years old.

Singing career
Bowen began as a teenage recording star in 1957 with "I'm Stickin' with You". The song started as the flip side of the hit record "Party Doll" by Buddy Knox (written by Knox and Bowen), but ultimately hit the charts on its own, peaking at No. 14 on Billboard'''s Hot 100 chart. Bowen's version sold over one million copies, and was awarded a gold record. Bowen's singing career did not take off as well as that of Knox, his partner in the Rhythm Orchids, and ultimately he abandoned a singing career, choosing to stay in the production end of the music industry.

Producer and music executive
In the early 1960s, in Los Angeles, California, he bucked the decade's rock phenomenon when Frank Sinatra hired him as a record producer for Reprise Records, and Bowen showed a strong knack for production, generating chart hits for Sinatra, Dean Martin, Bert Kaempfert and Sammy Davis, Jr., regarded as too old-fashioned for the market at the time. Among the songs Bowen produced for Sinatra was the 1966 "Strangers in the Night", which went to No. 1 in the US and UK, and won three Grammy Awards in 1967, including Record of the Year for Bowen.

Bowen also produced Dino, Desi & Billy, a group which included Dean Martin's son, and Desi Arnaz' and Lucille Ball's son.

In mid-1968, Bowen launched an independent record label, Amos Records, which lasted until 1971. Leaving Los Angeles for Nashville, Tennessee, Bowen became president of a series of record labels, and took each one to country music preeminence. His success stories during the second half of the 1970s and 1980s involved Glen Campbell, Kenny Rogers, Hank Williams, Jr., The Oak Ridge Boys, Reba McEntire, George Strait, Suzy Bogguss, Kim Carnes and Garth Brooks. Bowen helped Conway Twitty make the 1983 album Merry Twismas, which was one of Conway's No. 1 selling albums. Bowen also revolutionized the way music was recorded in Nashville, introducing digital technology and modernizing the way in which instruments such as drums, for example, were recorded and mixed.

In 1988, Bowen founded a label named Universal Records (not to be confused with the much more famous Universal Records of 1995 to 2005), which he sold to Capitol Records a year later.

Soundtracks
Bowen produced his first movie soundtrack in 1970, for Vanishing Point, which was released in 1971. That soundtrack contains three songs which he composed, as well as music from the band Mountain and from Big Mama Thornton. The three Bowen pieces are an incidental theme called "Love Theme", credited to Jimmy Bowen Orchestra, and two others, "Super Soul Theme" and the hard-rock piece "Freedom of Expression", credited to The J.B. Pickers. Other soundtracks include the movies Smokey and the Bandit II (1980), The Slugger's Wife (1985) and the soundtrack of the theater play Big River'' (1988).

Personal life
He is a graduate of the University of Pennsylvania's Wharton School of Business and holds an MBA with honors from Belmont University. He married singer Keely Smith in 1965 and produced her recordings for Reprise Records. The couple divorced in 1969.   He lives with his present wife Ginger in Longmont, Colorado.

Discography

Albums

Singles

Bibliography

References

Further reading

External links

1937 births
Living people
American country singer-songwriters
Record producers from Texas
Apex Records artists
Belmont University alumni
Crest Records artists
Grammy Award winners
Wharton School of the University of Pennsylvania alumni
Roulette Records artists
Singer-songwriters from Texas
People from Dumas, Texas
Country musicians from Texas